Adrian is a masculine given name.

Adrian may also refer to:

Places

Romania
 Adrian, a village in Livada town, Satu Mare County
 Adrian, a village in Gurghiu Commune, Mureș County

United States
Adrian, Georgia, a city
Adrian, Illinois, an unincorporated community
Adrian Township, Jackson County, Kansas
Adrian, Michigan, the county seat of Lenawee County
Adrian Charter Township, Michigan
Adrian, Minnesota, a city
Adrian Township, Watonwan County, Minnesota
Adrian, Missouri, a city
Adrian Township, LaMoure County, North Dakota
Adrian, New York, a hamlet
Adrian, Ohio, an unincorporated community
Adrian, Oregon, a city
Adrian, Pennsylvania, an unincorporated community
Adrian Township, Edmunds County, South Dakota
Adrian, Texas, a city
Adrian, U.S. Virgin Islands, a settlement
Adrian, a community in Grant County, Washington
Adrian, West Virginia, an unincorporated community
Adrian, Wisconsin, a town

People 
Adrian (surname)
Adrian (costume designer), Hollywood costume designer Adrian Greenburg (1903–1959)
Adrián (footballer), Spanish footballer Adrián San Miguel del Castillo (born 1987)
Adrian (gamer), American professional League of Legends player

Education
Adrian College, Adrian, Michigan
Adrian High School (disambiguation), several high schools

Other uses
Hurricane Adrian (disambiguation), several Pacific hurricanes
Adrian helmet, a combat helmet used by France in World Wars I and II
Baron Adrian, an extinct title in the Peerage of the United Kingdom
Adrian (fr), a 1983 album by Buzy (singer)
Adrian (TV series), an Italian animated series

See also
Ardian (disambiguation)
Adrien (disambiguation)
Adrienne (disambiguation)